Dead air space may refer to:

 Dead Air Space, a blog maintained by the members of the band Radiohead
 The spaces between panes of glass in insulated glazing
 No-fly zone: a territory or an area over which aircraft are not permitted to fly.